Kapsalon is a fast food dish created in 2003 in the Dutch city of Rotterdam, consisting of a layer of french fries placed into a disposable metal take-away tray, topped with döner or gyro meat, covered with slices of Gouda cheese, and heated in an oven until the cheese melts. Then a layer of shredded iceberg lettuce is added, dressed with garlic sauce and sambal, a hot sauce from  Indonesia, a former Dutch colony.  The term kapsalon is Dutch for "hairdressing salon" or barber shop, alluding to one of the inventors of the dish who worked as a hairdresser. The dish is a product of Dutch multiculturalism, combining elements of dishes from multiple cultures. The dish has spread internationally in a relatively short time.

Invention and spread

The dish was conceived in 2003 by Nathaniël Gomes, a Cape Verdean hairdresser in the Rotterdam district of Delfshaven, who one day at the neighboring shawarma store "El Aviva" asked to combine all his favorite ingredients into one dish. He began regularly to request what the restaurant called "the usual order for the kapsalon". Other customers noticed and started to order the kapsalon too, and it became a "hit", soon being demanded in nearby snack bars. The dish has since spread around the Netherlands and into Belgium, and several other countries in at least three continents. In some places the shawarma meat may be replaced with chicken, or doner kebab meat. The kapsalon has been described as "a typical example of contemporary cultural heritage", and "representative of the transnational nature of the city".

Kapsalon is a standard menu item in Belgian döner restaurants, both in Flanders and Wallonia. Various Turkish restaurants throughout Germany serve the dish, especially in larger cities. The dish can be found in other cities throughout Europe as well, such as major Polish cities (including Warsaw, Poznan and Kraków), in Prague, Czech Republic, cities in Latvia (including Riga, Jelgava, Jūrmala, Sigulda) in Oulu, Finland. It has been found in Morocco as well.

The kapsalon reached the Nepalese capital city of Kathmandu in 2017, when a chef returning from a visit to the Netherlands was asked to prepare a "typically Dutch" meal. Now chicken or fish replace the shawarma meat, and a porcelain plate substitutes for the metal tray, but the kapsalon has become fashionable, with many people posting photos and a prominent food blogger describing the dish as "a party in her mouth with her favorite tastes".

See also

 Carne asada fries
 Chorrillana
 Gyros
 Halal snack pack
 Mitraillette
 Poutine

References

External links
 

Food and drink introduced in 2003
Fast food
Street food
Dutch fusion cuisine
Dutch words and phrases
Rotterdam
Meat dishes
French fries